David Vumlallian Zou (born 25 January 1977) is a historian of modern South Asia with special interest in north-east India. His research interests reflect an interdisciplinary orientation that includes colonial history, book history, gender history, ethno-history, indigenous identities and historical geography.

Education
David V. Zou graduated in English literature (Major) from St. Anthony's College, Shillong, under North Eastern Hill University. He completed his MA and M.Phil from the Centre for Historical Studies,  Jawaharlal Nehru University, New Delhi. He completed his M.Phil dissertation under the supervision of Prof. Majid H. Siddiqi.

A fully funded PhD scholarship by the Academic Planning Grant (Northern Ireland) enabled him to pursue his PhD at Queen's University Belfast where he worked under M. Satish Kumar  and David N. Livingstone on print culture and identity formation in colonial north-east India.

Career and research
Zou joined the faculty of History Department, Faculty of Social Sciences, University of Delhi, where he teaches a paper on rise of capitalism and approaches to global history along with some aspects of labor history to postgraduate students. He is currently a member of the Departmental Research Committee (DRC) since February 2010,. and Board of Research Studies (BRS) Social Sciences at Delhi University since February 2011.

Zou is currently completing a monograph titled, Print, Identity and Gender in colonial Mizoram, to be published by SAGE Publications as a part of SAGE Studies of India's North East.

Publications
 Zou, David Vumlallian Zou (2018) "Embracing new gods: The process of religious change in northeast India" in Sajal Nag and Ishrat Alam (eds) Blending Nation And Region: Essays in Honour of Late Professor Amalendu Guha, New Delhi: Primus Books, pp. 325–343 https://www.amazon.com/s/ref=nb_sb_noss?url=search-alias%3Dstripbooks&field-keywords=blending+nation+and+region
 Zou, David Vumlallian (2018) "Vai phobia to Raj nostalgia: Sahibs, chiefs and commoners in colonial Lushai Hills" in Lipokmar Dzuvichu and Manjeet Baruah (eds.) Modern Practices in North East India, Abingdon & New York: Routledge, pp. 119–143. https://www.amazon.com/Modern-Practices-North-East-India/dp/1138106917/ref=sr_1_1?s=books&ie=UTF8&qid=1530013519&sr=1-1&keywords=modern+practices+in+north+east+india
Zou, David Vumlallian (2016) "Peoples, Power, and Belief in North-east India", in Meena Radhakrishna (ed.) Citizens First: Studies on Adivasis, Tribals, and Indigenous Peoples in India. Oxford: Oxford University Press.
Zou, David Vumlallian (2016) "Environment, Social Identity and Individual Freedom in the Current Historiography of Northeast India"
"Mapping a colonial Borderland: Objectifying the geo-body of India's Northeast" 
Zou, David Vumlallian (2010) "A Historical Study of the 'Zo' Struggle" (Special Article) Economic and Political Weekly (EPW), Vol. 45, No. 14, 3 April 2010, pp. 56 – 63.
Zou, David Vumlallian (2009) "The Pasts of a Fringe Community: Ethno-history and Fluid Identity of Zou in Manipur" Indian Historical Review, Vol. 36, No. 2, pp. 209 – 235.
Zou, David Vumlallian (2005) "Raiding the dreaded past: Representations of Headhunting and Human Sacrifice in Northeast India"
Zou, David Vumlallian (2003) "Colonial Discourse and Evangelical Imagining" Religion and Society, Vol. 48, No. 2, pp. 57 – 93.

References

Historians of South Asia
20th-century Indian historians
Historians of Northeast India
Living people
Alumni of Queen's University Belfast
Jawaharlal Nehru University alumni
North-Eastern Hill University alumni
Academic staff of Delhi University
Indigenous peoples of South Asia
1977 births